The Military Saints, Warrior Saints and Soldier Saints are patron saints, martyrs and other saints associated with the military. They were originally composed of the Early Christians who were soldiers in the Roman army during the persecution of Christians, especially the Diocletianic Persecution of AD 303–313.

Most of the Early Christian military saints were soldiers of the Roman Empire who had become Christian and, after refusing to participate in Imperial cult rituals of loyalty to the Roman Emperor, were subjected to corporal punishment including torture and martyrdom. 

Veneration of these saints, most notably of Saint George, was reinforced in the Latin Church during the time of the Crusades. The title of "champion of Christ" (athleta Christi) was originally used for these saints, but in the late medieval period also conferred on contemporary rulers by the Pope.

Since the Middle Ages, more saints have been added for various military-related patronages.

Hagiography
In Late Antiquity other Christian writers of hagiography, like Sulpicius Severus in his account of the heroic, military life of Martin of Tours, created a literary model that reflected the new spiritual, political, and social ideals of a post-Roman society.  
In a study of Anglo-Saxon soldier saints (Damon 2003), J.E. Damon has demonstrated the persistence of Sulpicius's literary model in the transformation of the pious, peaceful saints and willing martyrs of late antique hagiography to the Christian heroes of the early Middle Ages, who appealed to the newly converted societies led by professional warriors and who exemplified accommodation with and eventually active participation in holy wars that were considered just.

Iconography
The Military Saints are characteristically depicted as soldiers in traditional Byzantine iconography from about the 10th century (Macedonian dynasty) and especially in Slavic Christianity. 

The angelic prototype of the Christian soldier-saint is the Archangel Michael, whose earliest known cultus began in the 5th century with a shrine at Monte Gargano.
The iconography of soldier-saints  Theodore and George
as cavalrymen develops in the early medieval period.
The earliest image of St Theodore as a horseman (named in Latin) is from Vinica, North Macedonia and, if genuine, dates to the 6th or 7th century. Here, Theodore is not slaying a dragon, but holding a draco standard.
Three equestrian saints, Demetrius, Theodore and George, are depicted in the "Zoodochos Pigi" chapel in central Macedonia in Greece, in the prefecture of Kilkis, near the modern village of Kolchida, dated to the 9th or 10th century.
The "dragon-slaying" motif develops in the 10th century, especially iconography seen in the  Cappadocian cave churches of Göreme, where frescoes of the 10th century show military saints on horseback confronting serpents with one, two or three heads.
In later medieval Byzantine iconography, the pair of horsemen is no longer identified as Theodore and George, but as George and Demetrius.

List

Catholic
(NB: Some saints on the list remain unclassified as of 2021)

Eastern Orthodox Church
In the Romanian Orthodox Church:

 Michael the Archangel: protector of the Romanian Army, and, as the patron saint of Michael the Brave and as the symbol of the Romanian victory in the Great War, the protector of the unity of all Romanians. 
 Saint George: patron of the Romanian Land Forces 
 Saint Elijah: patron of the Romanian Air Forces
 Virgin Mary: patron of the Romanian Naval Forces

The Russian Orthodox Church: 

Michael the Archangel: military;  paratroopers; policemen (including MVD Police and the Military Police), Heavenly guardian of the Russian Lands.
Barbara: missile servicemen including those of the Strategic Missile Forces, the Missile Forces and Artillery and the Air Defense Forces of the Ground Forces, Air Defence of the Air Force, Russian Space Forces and Russian Aerospace Defence Force
Saint Alexander Nevskiy: soldiers protecting Russian Lands, National Guard of Russia, Spetsnaz.
Saint Dmitry Donskoy: soldiers under the Tank Troops and all motorized rifle units
Saint George: soldiers and all people protecting the nation, and Patron Saint of the city of Moscow. Also co-patron of cavalry and tank troops.
Saints Aleksandr Peresvet and Andrey Oslyabya: Radonezhskiy holy monk-warriors.
Saint Nikita the Warrior (Vesoron): Orthodox soldiers.
Saints Boris and Gleb, holy orthodox princes of Russia: soldiers.
Saint John the Warrior: soldiers.
Saint Merkuriy of Smolensk, warrior-martyr: soldiers.
Saint Evgeniy Sevastiyskiy, warrior-martyr: soldiers.
Prince Vladimir: Patron Saint of the National Guard of Russia
Saint Iliya Muromets: Patron of the Border Service of the Federal Security Service of the Russian Federation
Saint Feodor Stratilat: Orthodox soldiers.
Saint Elijah the Prophet: the Russian Air Force.
Saint Feodor Ushakov: the Navy, including nuclear submarines.
Saint Andrew: Russian Navy (Principal Patron)
Holy Prophet Isaiah: Russian Airborne Forces
Saint Seraphim of Sarov: Nuclear Warhead Specialists (12th GUMO)
Saint Martin of Tura: cavalry and the Tank Troops

See also

 Christians in the military
 Saint George: Devotions, traditions and prayers
 Military ordinariate
 Military order (monastic society)
Miles Christianus
New Testament military metaphors
List of patron saints by occupation and activity

References

Monica White, Military Saints in Byzantium and Rus, 900–1200 (2013).
Christopher Walter,  The Warrior Saints in Byzantine Art and Tradition (2003).
Piotr Grotowski, Arms and Armour of the Warrior Saints: Tradition and Innovation in Byzantine Iconography (843–1261),  Volume 87 of The Medieval Mediterranean (2010).

External links
David Woods, "The Military Martyrs" (ucc.ie)
The Warrior Saints (iconreader.wordpress.com) (2012)
Military Saints. Mission Capodanno website. Catholics in the Military. Retrieved 2011-08-11. 
Military Blesseds. Mission Capodanno website. Catholics in the Military. Retrieved 2011-08-11.
 http://kurufin.ru/html/Saints/saints-profession.html

 
Military
Ante-Nicene Christian martyrs
Christian iconography
Byzantine art
Lists of saints
Military traditions
Christians martyred during the reign of Diocletian